Peapully is a village in Peapally mandal, located in Nandyal district of the Indian state of Andhra Pradesh.

References 

Villages in Nandyal district